Chada is a village in Nalgonda district in Telangana State, India. It falls under Atmakur mandal. The lake here  called as Chada Cheruvu.

References

Villages in Nalgonda district